Anadasmus capnocrossa is a moth of the family Depressariidae. It is found in Brazil (Amazonas).

The wingspan is about 25 mm. The forewings are light brownish-ochreous with the plical and second discal stigmata very small, dark fuscous. The hindwings are rather dark grey.

References

Moths described in 1925
Anadasmus
Moths of South America